Manor AG is a Swiss department store chain with its headquarters in Basel. It is owned by Maus Frères of Geneva, and is Switzerland’s largest department-store chain. It generated total sales of CHF 3 billion in 2013. Manor has been a member of the International Association of Department Stores since 1968.

Company history

Brothers Ernest and Henri Maus together with Léon Nordmann opened their first department store in Lucerne in 1902, under the “Léon Nordmann” name. The more familiar “Manor” – a combination of the founders’ Maus and Nordmann surnames – did not appear until a new corporate identity was adopted in about 1965.

All the company’s department stores in German-speaking Switzerland have borne the Manor name since 1994, and all the stores in the rest of the country have carried the name since September 2000.

Locations
Manor's mainline stores are located in Basel, Geneva, Lausanne, Locarno, Lugano, Luzern & Zürich plus
Aarau, Albis, Ascona, Bachenbülach, Baden, Balerna, Bellinzona, Biasca, Biel/Bienne, Bulle, Bogis, Chur, Delémont, Emmen, Frauenfeld, Fribourg, Haag, Heerbrugg, Hinwil, Ibach, Kreuzlingen, La Chaux-de-Fonds, Langenthal, Liestal, Marin-Epagnier, Monthey, Morges, Nyon, Payerne, Pfaffikon, Rapperswil, Rickenbach, S. Antonino, Sargans, Schaffhausen, Schattdorf, Schönbühl, Sierre, Sion, Solothrun, Spreitenbach, St Gallen, Thun, Vesenaz, Vevey, Vezia, Wattwil, Winterthur, Wohlen, Yverdon-les-bains, & Zug.

See also
 List of Swiss companies

References

Retail companies of Switzerland
Companies based in Lucerne
Companies based in Basel
Switzerland
Retail companies established in 1902
Swiss companies established in 1902